Matilde Di Marzio was an Italian film actress of the silent era. She appeared in twenty seven films between 1913 and 1921, including Antony and Cleopatra (1913).

Selected filmography
Antony and Cleopatra (1913)
Ivan the Terrible (1917)

References

Bibliography 
 Hatchuel, Sarah & Vienne-Guerrin, Nathalie. Shakespeare on Screen: The Roman Plays. Publication Univ Rouen Havre, 2009.

External links 
 

Year of birth unknown
Year of death unknown
Italian film actresses
Italian silent film actresses
20th-century Italian actresses